The Sid W. Richardson Foundation is a philanthropic organization founded in 1947 by Sid W. Richardson (1891–1959), a Texan who earned his fortune in the oil industry. The foundation was primarily funded after his death. As of December 2020 it had assets of $716.8 million. 

The foundation was led from 1973 to 2011 by Valleau Wilkie Jr., and its current president is Pete Geren.

The foundation focuses on public-private partnerships in the area of education, health, human services, and the arts, to which it has donated  $545,189,317 since 1962. The charter of the foundation stipulated that recipients be in the state of Texas.

The foundation is housed in the same building as the Sid Richardson Museum which features numerous artworks including several Remington and Russell paintings collected by Sid W. Richardson.

Grants
Fort Worth Art Association	This grant provides operational support for the Modern Art Museum of Fort Worth. $750,000, in 2017.
UTeach Dallas received a $200,000 gift from the Foundation in 2008.
The Foundation donated $250,000 toward a new building for the Aransas County (Texas) EMS.
Grants 2018-2020

References

Organizations established in 1947
Non-profit organizations based in Texas
Foundations based in the United States
1947 establishments in Texas
Bass family